East Biggs (formerly, Rio Bonito) is a small unincorporated community in Butte County, California. It lies at an elevation of 121 feet (37 m).

The town was founded on the Northern Electric Railroad. Rio Bonito post office opened in 1909 and closed it in 1914.

References

Unincorporated communities in California
Unincorporated communities in Butte County, California